Rous River, a perennial river of the Tweed River catchment, is located in the Northern Rivers region of New South Wales, Australia.

Course and features
Rous River rises below Mount Hobwee on the southern slopes of the McPherson Range, near Numinbah on the New South Wales-Queensland border, and flows generally east by south, and then east, joined by four minor tributaries, before reaching its confluence with the Tweed River at Tumbulgum, northeast of Murwillumbah. The river descends  over its  course.

In its upper reaches, Rous River is fed by a minor tributary, Hopkins Creek, on the southern slopes of the McPherson Range, south of Mount Merino; and downriver of Numinbah near the small villages of Chillingham, Jacksons Creek enters the river. In its lower reaches, Rous River is fed by two minor tributaries, Nobbys Creek and Crystal Creek that emerge from the Numinbah Nature Reserve, south of Springbrook.

Adjustments to the natural flow of the river
In January 2006, partially treated sewerage entered the river from emergency tanks and ponds after storage at the Murwillumbah treatment plant, which had been off-line due to damage, was filled beyond capacity. Biological testing indicated the river water was hazardous which led to a temporary swimming ban.

In 2007, the federal government proposed damming the Rous River, Oxley River and Byrrill Creek. Local opposition to the plan was formed via the Save the Caldera Rivers Campaign, in an effort to stop the proposed dams from being built.

See also

 List of rivers of Australia

References

External links
 

 

Rivers of New South Wales
Northern Rivers
Tweed Shire